Rasbhari is an Indian psychological comedy miniseries starring Swara Bhaskar in triple roles, while Ayushman Saxena, Neelu Kohli and Aruna Soni in supporting roles. It is premiered on Amazon Prime 25 June 2020. The series was shot in Bijnor

Premise
Rasbhari captures the small-town milieu of Meerut perfectly. English teacher Shanu (Swara) comes to live in Meerut with her husband and overnight becomes the fantasy of her students and neighbours. Comfortable with her beauty and sexuality, she is branded a ‘husband snatcher’ by the women of the town while the men cannot stop thinking about her.

Cast
Swara Bhaskar as Rasbhari/Shanu Madam/Niharika
Ayushmaan Saxena as Nand Kishore Tyagi
Rashmi Agdekar as Priyanka
Praduman Singh as Naveen
Neelu Kohli as Pushpa
Sunny Hinduja as Pappu Tiwari
Akshay Suri as Vipul
Chittaranjan Tripathi as Tyagi
Akshay Batchu as Bhalla
Aruna Soni as Snehalata

Episodes

References

External links
 

Amazon Prime Video original programming
2020 Indian television series debuts
Indian drama television series
Hindi-language television shows